The eleventh cycle of Holland's Next Top Model premiered on 3 September 2018 on RTL5. Anna Nooshin is again the show's host.  The panel of judges was again composed of cycle 2 winner Kim Feenstra, photographer Nigel Barker and stylist JeanPaul Paula.

The prizes for this cycle included a modelling contract with VDM Model Management, a fashion spread in Elle magazine, and a campaign for Colgate Max White.

On October 22, 2018 it was announced that the winner of the competition was Soufyan Gnini.

Contestants 
(Ages stated are at start of contest) 

Safe:
Tim van Riel

Not Safe:
Bart van Houten
Cecilia Zevenhek
Daan Sanders
Danilo Julliet
Fee van der Meijs
Naomi Sauer
Ramanda van Eyck
Rikkie Kolle
Sara Slikkeveer
Soufyan Gnini

Episodes

Episode 1
Original airdate: 

This was the first casting episode. Out of 80 model hopefuls the top 20 semi-finalists were chosen.

Featured photographer: Marinke Davelaar

Episode 2
Original airdate: 

This was the second casting episode. The 20 semifinalists had a shoot where they all had to style the same blouse. With only 15 frames per contestant. The top 10 was chosen, who moved into a hostel.

Featured photographer: Jos Kottman

Episode 3
Original airdate: 

Quit: Sara Slikkeveer
Replacement: Naomi Sauer
Best photo: Ramanda van Eyck
Bottom two:  Danilo Julliet & Fee van der Meijs
Eliminated: Fee van der Meijs
Featured photographer: Feriet Tunc

Episode 4
Original airdate: 

Challenge winner: Naomi Sauer
Best photo: Danilo Julliet
Bottom two: Naomi Sauer & Ramanda van Eyck
Eliminated: Ramanda van Eyck
Featured photographer: Nigel Barker

Episode 5
Original airdate: 

Challenge winner: Cecilia Zevenhek
Best photo: Tim van Riel
Bottom three: Bart van Houten, Danilo Julliet & Naomi Sauer
First eliminated: Bart van Houten 
Second eliminated: Danilo Julliet 
Featured photographer: TBA

Episode 6
Original airdate: 

Best photo: Soufyan Gnini
Bottom two: Cecilia Zevenhek & Naomi Sauer
Eliminated: Naomi Sauer
Featured photographer: Jeroen Mantel

Episode 7
Original airdate: 

Best photo: Cecilia Zevenhek
Bottom two: Daan Sanders & Soufyan Gnini
Eliminated: Daan Sanders
Featured photographer:

Episode 8
Original airdate: 

Final four: Cecilia Zevenhek, Rikkie Kolle, Soufyan Gnini & Tim van Riel
Holland's Next Top Model: Soufyan Gnini
Special Guests:

Episode 9
Original airdate: 

This was the recap episode where the top 4 contestants were interviewed and had a photo shoot for Elle Netherlands.

Results

 The contestant was eliminated
 The contestants quit
 The contestant won the competition

References

External links
Official website

Holland's Next Top Model
2017 Dutch television seasons